Ostracion is a genus of the boxfish family Ostraciidae. Fish in the genus are known as box puffers. It was first described by Carl Linnaeus in 1758 and makes a brief appearance in Jules Verne's maritime sci-fi novel Twenty Thousand Leagues Under The Sea.

Species
The following are species in this genus:
 Ostracion cornutus Linnaeus, 1758
 Ostracion cubicus Linnaeus, 1758 (Yellow boxfish)
 Ostracion cyanurus Rüppell, 1828 (Bluetail trunkfish)
 Ostracion immaculatus Temminck & Schlegel, 1850 (Bluespotted boxfish)
 Ostracion meleagris G. Shaw, 1796 (White-spotted boxfish)
 Ostracion nasus Bloch, 1785 (Shortnose boxfish)
 Ostracion rhinorhynchos Bleeker, 1851 (Horn-nosed boxfish)
 Ostracion solorensis Bleeker, 1853 (Reticulate boxfish)
 Ostracion trachys J. E. Randall, 1975 (Roughskin trunkfish)
 Ostracion whitleyi Fowler, 1931 (Whitley's boxfish)

References

Ostraciidae
Extant Thanetian first appearances
Marine fish genera
Taxa named by Carl Linnaeus